The amphibians of Cambodia are diverse.

Species
 Chirixalus doriae
 Chirixalus nongkhorensis
 Chirixalus samkosensis
 Duttaphrynus melanostictus
 Feihyla vittata
 Fejervarya cancrivora
 Fejervarya limnocharis
 Fejervarya triora
 Glyphoglossus guttulata
 Glyphoglossus molossus
 Hoplobatrachus rugulosus
 Hylarana erythraea
 Hylarana macrodactyla
 Indosylvirana milleti
 Hylarana taipehensis
 Ichthyophis kohtaoensis
 Ichthyophis sp.
 Ingerophrynus galeatus
 Ingerophrynus macrotis
 Ingerophrynus parvus
 Kalophrynus interlineatus
 Kaloula indochinensis
 Kaloula mediolineata
 Kaloula pulchra
 Kurixalus bisacculus
 Leptobrachium mouhoti
 Leptolalax melicus
 Leptolalax sp. 1
 Leptolalax sp. 2
 Limnonectes kuhlii
 Limnonectes dabanus
 Limnonectes gyldenstolpei
 Limnonectes kohchangae
 Limnonectes limborgi
 Limnonectes poilani
 Limnonectes poilani
 Megophrys auralensis
 Megophrys damrei
 Megophrys lekaguli
 Megophrys major
 Microhyla annamensis
 Microhyla berdmorei
 Microhyla butleri
 Microhyla fissipes
 Microhyla heymonsi
 Microhyla pulchra
 Micryletta inornata
 Occidozyga lima
 Occidozyga martensii
 Odorrana banaorum
 Odorrana morafkai
 Ophryophryne hansi
 Ophryophryne synoria
 Papurana attigua
 Pelophylax lateralis
 Philautus abditus
 Philautus cardamonus
 Raorchestes parvulus
 Polypedates leucomystax
 Quasipaa fasciculispina
 Rana johnsi
 Rhacophorus annamensis
 Rhacophorus rhodopus
 Rhacophorus robertingeri
 Rhacophorus sp.
 Sylvirana faber
 Sylvirana mortenseni
 Sylvirana nigrovittata
 Theloderma asperum
 Theloderma stellatum
 Zhangixalus jarujini
 Zhangixalus smaragdinus

Consumption
Species collected for human consumption are Hoplobatrachus rugulosus, Fejervarya limnocharis, Glyphoglossus molossus,  pulchra]], Duttaphrynus melanostictus, and Pelophylax lateralis (with P. lateralis found only north of the Mekong river in localities such as Snuol district, Kratié province). Kaloula mediolineata is also likely consumed in northern Cambodia. Glyphoglossus molossus is the species most vulnerable to harvesting activities, while wild populations of Hoplobatrachus rugulosus are also declining due to intensive harvesting.

References

External links
 Species Database from Ministry of Environment

Cambodia
amphibians
Cambodia